Emiliano Dei (born 13 January 1971 in Rome, Italy) is an Italian footballer. He plays as a goalkeeper. He is currently playing for Carrarese Calcio.

See also
Football in Italy
List of football clubs in Italy

References

External links
 Emiliano Dei's profile on San Marino Calcio's official website

1971 births
Italian footballers
Living people
Benevento Calcio players
S.S.D. Varese Calcio players
Rimini F.C. 1912 players
A.S.D. Victor San Marino players
Association football goalkeepers
U.S. Castrovillari Calcio players